Johann Bauschinger (11 June 1834, in Nuremberg – 25 November 1893, in Munich) was a mathematician, builder, and professor of Engineering Mechanics at Munich Polytechnic from 1868 until his death. The Bauschinger effect in materials science is named after him. He was also the father of astronomer Julius Bauschinger (1860–1934).

References
.

1834 births
1893 deaths
Scientists from Nuremberg
19th-century German mathematicians
Academic staff of the Technical University of Munich